Tony Currie (born 1951) is a Scottish broadcaster who most recently worked as a continuity announcer for BBC Scotland.

He began working in radio at KPFK Radio in Los Angeles in 1972 before joining Scotland's first independent local radio station, Radio Clyde, a year later as the first voice on air. In April 1976, he joined Scottish Television as a continuity announcer, after freelancing at the station as a trail voiceover. He became chief announcer, reading the daily lunchtime and late evening Scottish News bulletins, and bulletins within the nightly regional news programme, Scotland Today.

After leaving Scottish in January 1987, he became Controller of Programmes for the Cable Authority and latterly, cable programming controller for the Independent Television Commission. After a spell as chief executive of AsiaVision, he set up the Irish satellite television station Tara Television as director of programmes before becoming chairman and chief executive of Cambridge Cafe Radio.

He then became a television Announcer-Director for BBC Scotland's television channels BBC ONE Scotland and BBC TWO Scotland, taking a year out to schedule, produce and present BBC Radio Scotland's overnight strand, Nightshift, and as host of that programme he was the first person to broadcast from the Corporation's new headquarters at Pacific Quay, Glasgow.

He has chaired both the Royal Television Society Scotland and the Radio Academy in Scotland.

As a writer he's contributed to Radio Times, TV Times, The Guardian, The Herald, Scotland on Sunday, Glasgow Evening Times, and was a regular columnist for Broadcast magazine, Broadcast Systems International, The Times Educational Supplement, and Communications Monthly.

He has written three published books - "A Concise History of British Television" (Kelly Publications, 2003 ) , "The Radio Times Story" (Kelly Publications, 2001  ) and "Not Quite Altogether Now!" (Neil Wilson Publishing, 2009  ) (the story of the launch and early days of radio Clyde).

He is currently Director of an internet radio station, Radio Six International, which syndicates its programming to 56 radio stations around the world. He currently presents various weekly shows including Nothing But The Best and The Lively Lounge.

In 1993, Currie led a failed bid for Radio Six to win the new regional FM licence for Central Scotland as a 24-hour news and speech station. The consortium lost out to Scot FM (now Heart Scotland).

External links
Radio Six International official site

References

Radio and television announcers
Scottish radio presenters
1951 births
Living people